Aeshna eremita, the lake darner, is a species of dragonfly in the family Aeshnidae. It is found in Alaska, the Northern United States and across Canada. It is similar in size and markings to the Canada darner, but has a black line across its face.

References

External links

Lake darner, Talk about Wildlife
Lake darner images, BugGuide
Lake darner, Montana Field Guide
Lake darner, Ecobirder
Lake darner, AeserePhoto

Aeshnidae
Insects described in 1896